Alambur (also Alamburu) is a village in Mysore district of Karnataka, India.

Location
Alambur is located on the road from Nanjangud to Tirumakudal Narsipur.

Schools
The Government Higher Primary School was established in 1946. The school has six teachers handling classes from one to eight.

Demographics
Alambur has a population of 2,073, with a total of 488 families. Literacy is 51%.

Administration
Alambur village is administered by the village council called a Panchayath.  It comes under Nanjangod Taluk.

See also
 Jeemaralli
 Kahalli
 Nagarle
 Sutturu

References

Villages in Mysore district